Scea superba is a moth of the family Notodontidae first described by Herbert Druce in 1890. It is found in South America, including Ecuador.

The larvae feed on Passiflora manicata.

External links
Dyer, L. A.; Miller, J. S.; Rab Green, S. B.; Gentry, G. L.; Greeney, H. F. & Walla, T. W. "Scea superba (Druce)". Caterpillars and Parasitoids of the Eastern Andes in Ecuador. Retrieved January 5, 2019.

Notodontidae of South America
Moths described in 1890